The American invastion of Afgahaistan started in 2001 and ended in 2021. It started because of the 9/11 attacks conducted by Al-Qaeda.
The war in Afghanistan was America's longest war.

The following items form a partial timeline of the War in Afghanistan. For events prior to October 7, 2001, see 2001 in Afghanistan.

2001

October 7: (9 p.m. local time): the United States, supported by Britain, begins its attack on Afghanistan, launching bombs and cruise missiles against Taliban military and communications facilities and suspected terrorist training camps. Kabul, Kandahar, and Herat were hit.
October 9: A cruise missile kills four U.N. demining employees and injured four others in a building several miles east of Kabul.
October 19: Airborne invasion into Afghanistan by Rangers of the Third Ranger Battalion, Seventy Fifth Ranger Regiment and others seizing a Qandahar airfield named Objective Rhino.
October 26: Abdul Haq killed.
November 6: Zari, Keshendeh and Aq-Kupruk fall to the Northern Alliance
November 8: Pakistan, being the only nation that still had diplomatic ties to the Taliban, asked Afghanistan's rulers to close their consulate in the city of Karachi.
November 9: Battle of Mazari Sharif. 
November 10: The Taliban and Northern Alliance fighters both claimed that the strategic northern Afghan city of Mazari Sharif was taken by Northern Alliance fighters.
November 11: Journalists Pierre Billaud, Johanne Sutton, and Volker Handloik are ambushed and killed.
November 12: Taliban forces abandon Kabul ahead of advancing Northern Alliance troops.
2001 uprising in Herat. 
November 14: Northern Alliance fighters took over Kabul, the Afghan capital, and then controlled virtually all the north of Afghanistan.
November 16: Mohammed Atef, the military chief of al-Qaeda, killed in a US airstrike.
November 19: Four foreign journalists - Harry Burton, Maria Grazia Cutuli, Azizullah Haidari, and Julio Fuentes – were ambushed and killed.
November 25: Northern Alliance gained control of Kunduz, the last Taliban stronghold in Northern Afghanistan, but only after Pakistani aircraft rescue several thousand Taliban and Al-Qaeda fighters and their military advisers. The Taliban then controlled less than 25% of the country, mainly around Kandahar in the south.
U.S. Marines landed in force by helicopter at Camp Rhino south of Kandahar and began preparing it for fixed wing aircraft. They also occupied the main road between Kandahar and Pakistan.
Battle of Qala-i-Jangi.  Forces loyal to bin Laden smuggled weapons into their prison near Mazar i Sharif after surrendering at Kunduz. They attacked the Northern Alliance guards and storm an armory. U.S. Special Forces call in air attacks. Hundreds of prisoners are killed as well as 40 Alliance fighters and one U.S. CIA operative, Johnny Michael Spann. Spann becomes the first U.S. and Coalition combat casualty. A young American named John Walker Lindh is found in the midst of the rebellion and extradited to the US on terrorism charges.
December 6: Kandahar falls.
December: The Battle of Tora Bora against Taliban and al-Qaeda fighters; Osama bin Laden reportedly escapes during this battle.
December: The Dasht-i-Leili massacre, where hundreds of Taliban were allegedly suffocated to death while being transported in metal containers.
December: The Bonn Agreement establishes the postwar system of government for Afghanistan, and establishes the International Security Assistance Force.
December 22: The interim Afghan government is sworn in.

2002

January 4: First US soldier dies due to hostile fire, Sergeant First Class (SFC) Nathan Chapman.
January 24, the Hazar Qadam raid sees Americans accidentally attack an allied compound collecting weapons for their Karzai government
February 14: Abdul Rahman, Afghan Aviation and Tourism Minister, killed by angry Hajj pilgrims.
March 1: Operation Anaconda against al-Qaeda fighters launched.
April 17: The 87-year-old exiled king of Afghanistan, Mohammed Zahir Shah, returns.
April 18: Tarnak Farm incident leaves four Canadians dead from friendly fire.
June 11: King Zahir Shah opens the first post-Taliban loya jirga.
July 1: In Uruzgan province, a US AC-130 gunship struck a wedding party, killing 48 civilians and injuring 117. The United States claimed their plane had come under attack from anti-aircraft fire before the strike.
July 6: Vice President Abdul Qadir assassinated in Kabul.
September 5: 2002 Kabul bombing kills 30 people.

2003

August 11 – NATO officially takes command of peacekeeping in Afghanistan.
December 14 – 2003 loya jirga convened to  consider the proposed Afghan Constitution.

2004

January 4 – Constitution approved by Loya Jirga.
January 26 – Constitution signed by President Hamid Karzai.
October 9 – 2004 Afghan presidential election. In the country's first direct election, Hamid Karzai wins the presidency with 55.4% of the vote.

2005

June 28: Operation Red Wings results in the death of 19 Americans and many Taliban fighters.
September 18: 2005 Afghan parliamentary election.

2006

January 13: Damadola airstrike by US in Pakistan.
February 1: The Afghanistan Compact is developed, establishing a framework of international cooperation with Afghanistan.
March 29: Battle of Lashkagar. Taliban fighters attack a NATO base.
May 15: Operation Mountain Thrust is launched, the largest offensive since the fall of the Taliban.
July: Battle of Panjwaii between Canadian NATO forces and the Taliban.
September 2: Canadians launch Operation Medusa.
September 16: Operation Mountain Fury.

2007

February 27: 2007 Bagram Air Base bombing during US Vice President Dick Cheney’s visit.
March 4: Afghan civilians killed by U.S. troops in Shinwar.
March 6: Operation Achilles against the Taliban in Helmand Province.
May 12: Mullah Dadullah killed.
May 13: Afghanistan–Pakistan Skirmishes.
June 15: Battle of Chora begins.
June 28: The Hyderabad airstrike kills a large number of civilians including women and children.
July 19: 2007 South Korean hostage crisis in Afghanistan begins.
August 16: Nangar Khel massacre - Eight civilians including a pregnant women and a baby died when Polish  soldiers shelled the village of Nangar Khel. Seven soldiers have been charged with war crimes.
November 6: 2007 Baghlan sugar factory bombing kills 75, including six Afghan MPs.
December 7: Battle of Musa Qala, a major clash in Helmand Province.

2008

January 14: The 2008 Kabul Serena Hotel attack leaves six people dead.
February 17: 2008 Kandahar bombing kills 100 people, the deadliest suicide bombing of the war.
June 10: Gora Prai airstrike in Pakistan kills 11 Pakistani paramilitary troops.
June 13: Sarposa Prison attack. Taliban attack the Sarposa Prison, freeing up to 1,000 prisoners.
July 6: Deh Bala wedding party bombing. 47 civilians mostly women and children killed in Nangarhar province.
July 7: The 2008 Indian embassy bombing in Kabul kills 58, including four Indians.  India blames Pakistan's Inter-Services Intelligence for the attack.
July 13: Battle of Wanat. Taliban fighters attack a NATO base, killing nine American soldiers.
August 19: The Taliban kill 10 French soldiers in the Uzbin valley ambush.
August 22: Azizabad airstrike kills up to 90 Afghan civilians.
August 27: Operation Eagle's Summit begins in Helmand Province.
September: United States-Pakistan skirmishes.
September 3: Angoor Ada raid by US special forces into Pakistan.
November 3: Wech Baghtu wedding party attack kills 37 civilians, mostly women and children.
December 19: US vows to send 3,000 more troops to Afghanistan.

2009

February 11: February 2009 Kabul raids
May 4: The Granai airstrike resulted in one of the highest civilian death tolls from Western military action since foreign forces invaded Afghanistan in 2001.
July 2: Operation Khanjar begins
September 4: NATO planes attacks two fuel tankers, which had been hijacked by Taliban insurgents. Up to 142 people died in the attack, including over 100 Afghan civilian victims.
December 1: U.S. President Barack Obama announces Afghanistan War troop surge of 2009.
December 16: Operation Septentrion, assault by 1100 soldiers (mostly French) in the Uzbin Valley.
December 29: 10 Afghan civilians mostly school children killed by special operation forces in the botched Narang night raid.

2010

February 12: Five innocent civilians including two pregnant women and a teenage girl killed in the botched Khataba raid.
February 21: Uruzgan helicopter attack kills 27-33 civilians including four women and a child in Uruzgan province.
Spring: Operation Moshtarak Phase I is led by US Marines to retake Marjah, in Helmand Province, from the Taliban.
Spring-Summer: U.S. Surge to Afghanistan sees its peak, as 20,000 soldiers are deployed to the south
June 23: General Stanley A. McChrystal, commander of the ISAF, resigns after controversial comments critical of the Obama administration were published in a magazine.
July 23: The Sangin airstrike kills a large number of Afghan civilians mostly women and children in Nangarhar province.
July 25: WikiLeaks releases 90,000 leaked documents pertaining to the war in Afghanistan.
September 18: Afghan Parliamentary Elections are held, widely criticized as fraudulent, although with notable instances of electoral institution impartiality.
Fall: Operation Moshtarak Phases II and III are held in Kandahar, driving the Taliban out of traditional safe-havens
Fall: Command of Regional Command South rotates from British to American command.

2011

January 26: The Afghan National Assembly is inaugurated.
May 1: The number one Al-Qaeda leader Osama bin Laden is killed by U.S. Navy SEALs in Abbottabad, Pakistan, just miles from Islamabad.
May 23: 4 U.S. soldiers (2nd Battalion 27th Infantry Regiment) die and 1 wounded following an improvised explosive device attack in Kunar province.
June 4–6: The Battle Of Gewi Ridge takes place where a platoon of U.S. soldiers air-assaulted the mountain ridge of Gewi (Kunar province) for over-watch of a major re-supply convoy.  Following the insertion, an intensive firefight lasting 52 hours takes place, resulting in the deaths of 50+ Taliban insurgents.
August 6: A CH-47 Chinook helicopter transporting 30 U.S. soldiers (including 17 Navy SEALs), 1 civilian interpreter and 7 Afghan troops is shot down in Wardak Province by RPG-wielding Taliban insurgents. There were no survivors of the crash. This incident marks the deadliest day for U.S. Forces in Afghanistan since the invasion in 2001.
August 11: Vengeance is exacted on the 11 Taliban militants involved in downing the CH-47 Chinook, who are killed in an F-16 airstrike. Meanwhile, five ISAF service members die following an improvised explosive device attack in the southern provinces.
September 20: Burhanuddin Rabbani, the former President and head of the High Peace Council, was assassinated by Taliban suicide bombers in Kabul.
December 9: Mohammed Ishmael, Ghaziabad district (Kunar province) police chief is killed in a suicide bombing of a mosque carried out by a 12-year-old Pakistani boy.

2012

2013

The army of the United States continues to conduct missions throughout Afghanistan, began closing forward operating bases (FOB).

2021

 May 1: The Taliban begins its summer offensive.
 August 6: The Taliban capture Zaranj.
 August 13: Battle of Lashkargah concludes with a Taliban victory. Herat falls. Battle of Kandahar ends with Taliban victory.
 August 15: The Taliban capture Kabul. The Islamic Republic collapses as the Taliban begins reinstating the Islamic Emirate. An international airlift of refugees begins.
 September 6: The Captital of Panjshir provence, Bazarak and other Districts fall, but the Resistance. 
Resistance

See also
2006: Coalition combat operations in Afghanistan in 2006
2007: Coalition combat operations in Afghanistan in 2007
2008: Coalition combat operations in Afghanistan in 2008

Notes

References

 
War in Afghanistan (2001–2021)-related lists